James Massterson was an American football coach.  He served as the co-head football coach at Fordham University with John Couch for one season in 1898. Together they compiled a record of 1–1–2.

Head coaching record

References

Year of birth missing
Year of death missing
Fordham Rams football coaches